Souanké Airport  is an airport serving the town of Souanké, Republic of the Congo.

See also

List of airports in the Republic of the Congo
Transport in the Republic of the Congo

References

External links
OurAirports - Souanké
OpenStreetMap - Souanké Airport

Airports in the Republic of the Congo